Lewis's tuco-tuco (Ctenomys lewisi) is a species of rodent in the family Ctenomyidae. It is endemic to Bolivia.

References

Tuco-tucos
Mammals of Bolivia
Mammals of the Andes
Endemic fauna of Bolivia
Mammals described in 1926
Taxa named by Oldfield Thomas
Taxonomy articles created by Polbot